Václav Kadlec (born 20 May 1992) is a Czech professional footballer who plays as a forward for Viktoria Žižkov.

Club career
Kadlec made his debut in the Czech First League on 25 October 2008 for AC Sparta Prague against 1. FK Příbram. He scored his first league goal at the age of 16. Kadlec had a trial at Liverpool's academy in 2007. In November 2012 Kadlec fractured his skull in a collision with Martin Nešpor during Sparta Prague's match against FK Mladá Boleslav.

On 18 August 2013, Kadlec joined Eintracht Frankfurt for an undisclosed fee, signing a contract due to expire in the summer of 2017.

After a short loan at Letná he transferred to Danish side FC Midtjylland during the 15/16 season. However, he decided to return to Sparta in the summer transfer window of 2016. He signed a four-year contract with the club.

On 29 September 2016, with Sparta Prague, he scored twice in the 3–1 win against Internazionale in Europa League.

In February 2020, Kadlec announced his retirement from playing due to persistent knee problems.

On 2 September 2022, Kadlec joined FK Viktoria Žižkov.

International career
On 12 October 2010, Kadlec made his first appearance for the Czech Republic national team against Liechtenstein and scored on his debut, becoming the youngest goalscorer in the Czech Republic national team history. He was voted the Czech Talent of the Year at the 2010 Czech Footballer of the Year awards. Later in the year he made his debut for the under-21 team, also marking it with a goal. He represented the team at the 2011 UEFA European Under-21 Football Championship.

Career statistics

Club

International
Scores and results list Czech Republic's goal tally first, score column indicates score after each Kadlec goal.

Honours
Sparta Prague
Czech First League: 2009–10, 2013–14
Czech Supercup: 2010

Czech Republic U21 
UEFA European Under-21 Championship bronze: 2011

References

External links
Official website of Václav Kadlec

1992 births
Living people
Footballers from Prague
Association football forwards
Czech footballers
Czech Republic youth international footballers
Czech Republic under-21 international footballers
Czech Republic international footballers
Czech First League players
Bundesliga players
Danish Superliga players
AC Sparta Prague players
Eintracht Frankfurt players
FC Midtjylland players
FK Mladá Boleslav players
Czech expatriate footballers
Expatriate footballers in Germany
Expatriate men's footballers in Denmark
Czech expatriate sportspeople in Denmark
Czech expatriate sportspeople in Germany
FK Jablonec players
FK Viktoria Žižkov players
Bohemian Football League players